M82, M 82 or M-82 most often refers to:
 Barrett M82, a .50 caliber rifle
 Messier 82, a galaxy

M82, M 82 or M-82 may also refer to:

Astronomy
 M82 X-1, a candidate black hole in Messier 82

Aviation
 Shvetsov ASh-82, an aircraft engine produced in the Soviet Union

Military
 Arsenal M82, an 82 mm mortar
 Parker-Hale M82, 7.62-caliber rifle
 Valmet M82, an assault rifle
 HMAS Huon (M 82), a Royal Australian Navy minehunter

Transportation
 M-82 (Michigan highway), a state highway in Michigan
 Madison County Executive Airport, an airport near Huntsville, Alabama (former FAA LID code: M82)

See also

 
 
 82 (disambiguation)